St Barnabas' Church is a redundant Anglican church in Sibell Street, Chester, Cheshire, England.  It is recorded in the National Heritage List for England as a designated Grade II listed building. It was originally built as a mission church, financed from public subscription, to serve the workers living near Chester railway station. The church and the adjacent curate's house were designed by John Douglas in 1877.

The church is built in brick with stone dressings.  The house is also in brick with a timber-framed front.  Both have slated roofs.  The church has a six-bay nave which is continuous with a one-bay chancel.  There is a two-bay north transept with an attached eastern vestry, a west porch and an octagonal northwest baptistry. On the roof is a flèche surmounted by ball and cross.  Between the church and the curate's house is a roofed lobby. From 1985 to 1987 the church was used by the Orthodox Christian parish of St Barbara's before the community moved due to the dilapidated state of the building. The church has subsequently been used as offices.

See also

Grade II listed buildings in Chester (north and west)
List of new churches by John Douglas

References

Churches completed in 1877
19th-century Church of England church buildings
Gothic Revival church buildings in England
Gothic Revival architecture in Cheshire
Former Church of England church buildings
Grade II listed churches in Cheshire
Church of England church buildings in Cheshire
Churches in Chester
John Douglas buildings
Grade II listed buildings in Chester
1877 establishments in England